The Farnese Atlas is a 2nd-century AD Roman marble sculpture of Atlas holding up a celestial globe. Probably a copy of an earlier work of the Hellenistic period, it is the oldest extant statue of Atlas, a Titan of Greek mythology who is represented in earlier Greek vase painting, and the oldest known representation of the celestial spheres and the classical constellations. The sculpture is at the National Archaeological Museum of Naples, in Italy.

The statue is dated around AD 150, during the Roman Empire and after the composition of the Almagest by Claudius Ptolemy, but the celestial globe has long been presumed to represent constellations mapped in earlier Hellenistic astrology, particularly in the work of Hipparchus in the 2nd century BC.

Atlas labors under the weight because he had been sentenced by Zeus to hold up the sky. The sphere shows a depiction of the night sky as seen from outside the outermost celestial sphere, with low reliefs depicting 41 (some sources say 42) of the 48 classical Greek constellations distinguished by Ptolemy, including Aries the ram, Cygnus the swan and Hercules the hero.

The name Farnese Atlas reflects its acquisition by Cardinal Alessandro Farnese in 1562, and its subsequent exhibition in the Villa Farnese.

Dating the original
In 2005, at a meeting of the American Astronomical Society in San Diego, California, Bradley E. Schaefer, a professor of physics at Louisiana State University, presented a widely reported analysis concluding that the text of Hipparchus' long lost star catalog may have been the inspiration for the representation of the constellations on the globe, thereby reviving and expanding an earlier proposal by Georg Thiele (1898). The constellations are fairly detailed and Schaefer regards them as scientifically accurate given the period of the globe's creation, implying that it was modeled after a scholarly work. His statistical analysis concludes that the positions of these constellations are consistent with where they would have appeared in the time of Hipparchus (129 BC) – leading to the conclusion that the statue is based on the star catalog.

However, because the globe contains no actual stars, and because the circles on the globe are drawn inexactly and ambiguously by a sculptor copying the Hellenistic model rather than by a modern astronomer, the dating of the globe is still uncertain and its source or sources remain controversial; Schaefer's conclusions have been strongly contested (e.g. by Dennis Duke) most particularly on the ground that regardless of the globe's date the constellations on it show large disagreements with the only existing work by Hipparchus.

See also
Globe
Celestial cartography
Celestial sphere
Celestial spheres
Early world maps

References

External links
Bradley E. Schaefer, "The epoch of the constellations on the Farnese Atlas and their origins in Hipparchus's lost catalogue"
New York Times article on Dr. Schaefer's presentation
Space.com article on the Hipparchus' star catalogue found.
National Archaeological Museum, Naples, Italy
Critiques of Schaefer's hypothesis
Critical review of Schaefer's arithmetic, quotations, statistics, photogrammetry, grasp of Hipparchus's data, and responsiveness
Related critical review, containing detailed photographic images

2nd-century Roman sculptures
Farnese Collection
Collections of the National Archaeological Museum, Naples
Roman copies of Greek sculptures
Archaeological discoveries in Italy
Ancient astronomy
Maps in art
Sculptures of Greek gods
Atlas (mythology)